The American Academy of Underwater Sciences (AAUS) is a group of scientific organizations and individual members who conduct scientific and educational activities underwater. It was organized in 1977 and incorporated in the State of California in 1983.

Purpose and activities 
The mission of the AAUS is to facilitate the development of safe and productive scientific divers through education, research, advocacy, and the advancement of standards for scientific diving practices, certifications, & operations.

The AAUS administrates the AAUS Foundation, which is a 501c3 charity to provide internships and scholarships to students who study scientific diving or use scientific diving as a research tool.

Scientific diving standards 
The AAUS is responsible for the promulgation of the AAUS Standards for Scientific Diving Certification and Operation of Scientific Diving Programs.  These are the consensual guidelines for scientific diving programs in the US, and are recognized by Occupational Safety and Health Administration as the "Standard" for scientific diving. These standards are followed by all AAUS Organizational Members allowing for reciprocity between institutions. Each institution is responsible for upholding the standards within its program and among its divers. The AAUS peer reviews the standards on a regular basis, so they represent the consensus of the scientific diving community and state-of-the-art technologies.

Exemption from commercial diving regulations
In 1975 the United Brotherhood of Carpenters and Joiners of America petitioned for an emergency temporary standard be issued with respect to occupational diving operations. The ETS issued on June 15, 1976 was to be effective from July 15, 1976 but was challenged in the US Court of Appeals by several diving contractors, and was withdrawn in November 1976. A permanent standard for commercial diving  became effective on 20 October 1977, but it did not consider the needs of scientific diving. The scientific diving community was unable to operate as previously, and in 1977 united to form the American Academy of Underwater Sciences (AAUS)

Publications

Library 
Many of the AAUS publications were available online at the Rubicon Research Repository.

References

External links
American Academy of Underwater Sciences
American Academy of Underwater Sciences Records MSS 0773 Special Collections & Archives, UC San Diego Library.

Diving organizations